Iron acetate can refer to:

 Ferric acetate (iron(III) acetate), [Fe3O(CH3CO2−)6(H2O)3]CH3CO2− 
 Ferrous acetate (iron(II) acetate), Fe(CH3COO)2